The Men's Scratch was one of the 9 men's events at the 2006 UCI Track Cycling World Championships, held in Bordeaux, France.

24 cyclists from 24 countries participated in the contest. Because of the number of entries, there were no qualification rounds for this discipline. Consequently, the event was run direct to the final.

Final
The Final and only race was run at 15:45 on April 15. The competition consisted of 60 laps, making a total of 15 km.

References

Men's scratch
UCI Track Cycling World Championships – Men's scratch